Mankombu Sambasivan Swaminathan (born 7 August 1925) is an Indian agronomist, agricultural scientist, plant geneticist, administrator and humanitarian. Swaminathan is a global leader of the green revolution. He has been called the main architect of the green revolution in India for his leadership and role in introducing and further developing high-yielding varieties of wheat and rice.  Swaminathan's collaborative scientific efforts with Norman Borlaug, spearheading a mass movement with farmers and other scientists and backed by public policies, saved India and Pakistan from certain famine-like conditions in the 1960s. His leadership as Director General of the International Rice Research Institute (IRRI) in the Philippines was instrumental in his being awarded the first World Food Prize in 1987, recognized as the Nobel or the highest honours in the field of agriculture. United Nations Environment Programme has called him 'the Father of Economic Ecology'.

Swaminathan contributed basic research related to potato, wheat and rice, in areas such as cytogenetics, ionizing radiation and radiosensitivity. He has been a President of the Pugwash Conferences and the International Union for Conservation of Nature (IUCN). In 1999, he was one of three Indians, along with Gandhi and Tagore, on TIME magazines' list of the '20 Most Influential Asian People of the 20th Century', along with Eiji Toyoda, Dalai Lama and Mao Zedong. Swaminathan has received numerous awards and honours, including the Shanti Swarup Bhatnagar Award, Ramon Magsaysay Award and the Albert Einstein World Science Award. mms chaired the National Commission on Farmers (NCF) in 2004 which recommended far-reaching ways to improve India's farming system. He is the founder of an eponymous research foundation. He coined the term 'Evergreen Revolution' in 1990 to describe his vision of 'productivity in perpetuity without associated ecological harm'. He was nominated to the Parliament of India for one term between 2007 and 2013. During his tenure he tabled a bill for the recognition of women farmers in India, however it lapsed.

Life

Early life and education 
Swaminathan was born in Kumbakonam, Madras Presidency on 7 August 1925. He was the second son of general surgeon Dr. M. K. Sambasivan and Parvati Thangammal Sambasivan who hailed from Alappuzha district in Kerala. After his father's death when he was 11, young Swaminathan was looked after by his father's brother.

Swaminathan was educated at a local high school and later at the Catholic Little Flower High School in Kumbakonam, from which he matriculated at age 15. Right from childhood, he had interaction with farming and farmers; his extended family grew rice, mangoes and coconut, later expanding into areas such as coffee. He saw the impact fluctuations in the price of crops had on his family, including the devastation that weather and pest could cause to crops as well as incomes.

His parents wanted him to study medicine. With that in mind, he took started off his higher education with zoology. But, when he witnessed the impacts of the Bengal famine of 1943 during the Second World War and shortages of rice throughout the sub-continent, he decided to devote his life to ensuring India had enough food. Despite his family background, and belonging to an era where medicine and engineering were considered much more prestigious, he chose agriculture.

He went on to finish his undergraduate degree in zoology at Maharaja's College in Trivandrum, Kerala (now known as University College, Thiruvananthapuram at the University of Kerala). He then studied at University of Madras (Madras Agricultural College, now the Tamil Nadu Agricultural University) from 1940 to 1944 and earned a Bachelor of Science degree in agricultural science. During this time he was also taught by Cotah Ramaswami, professor of agronomy.

In 1947 he moved to the Indian Agricultural Research Institute (IARI) in New Delhi to study genetics and plant breeding. He obtained a post-graduate degree with high distinction in cytogenetics in 1949. His research focused on the genus Solanum, with specific attention to the potato. Social pressures resulted in him competing in the examinations for civil services through which he was selected to the Indian Police Service. However at the same time, an opportunity for him arose in the agriculture field in the form of a UNESCO fellowship in genetics in the Netherlands. He chose genetics.

Netherlands and Europe 
He was a UNESCO fellow at the Wageningen Agricultural University, Institute of Genetics in the Netherlands, for eight months. The demand for potato during the second world war resulted in deviations in age-old crop rotations. This caused golden nematode infestations in certain areas such as reclaimed agricultural lands. Swaminathan worked on adapting genes to provide resilience against such parasites, as well as cold weather. To this effect, the research succeeded. Ideologically the university influenced his later scientific pursuits in India with respect to food production. During this time he also made a visit to Max Planck Institute for Plant Breeding Research in war-torn Germany; this would later influence him deeply as during his next visit, a decade later, he saw that the Germans had transformed Germany, both infrastructurally and energetically.

United Kingdom 
In 1950, he moved to study at the Plant Breeding Institute of the University of Cambridge School of Agriculture. He earned a Doctor of Philosophy (Ph.D.) degree in 1952, for his thesis, "Species Differentiation, and the Nature of Polyploidy in certain species of the genus Solanum – section Tuberarium." The next Christmas he stayed for a week with a F.L. Brayne, a former Indian Civil Service officer, whose experiences with rural India influenced Swaminathan in his later years.

United States of America 
Swaminathan then spent 15 months in the United States. He accepted a post-doctoral research associateship at the University of Wisconsin, Laboratory of Genetics to help set up a USDA potato research station. The laboratory at the time had Nobel laureate Joshua Lederburg on its faculty. His associateship ended in December 1953. He was offered a faculty position, however Swaminathan refused. His aim continued to be to make a difference back home in India.

India 
He returned to India in early 1954. There were no jobs in his specialisation and it was only three months later that he got the opportunity through a former professor to work temporarily as an assistant botanist at Central Rice Research Institute in Cuttack. At Cuttack, he was under an indica-japonica rice hybridisation program started by Krishnaswami Ramiah. This stint would go on to influence his future work with wheat. Half a year later he joined Indian Agricultural Research Institute (IARI) in New Delhi in October 1954 as an assistant cytogeneticist. Swaminathan was critical of India importing food grains when seventy percent of India was dependent on agriculture. Further drought and famine-like situations were developing in the country.

Swaminathan and Norman Borlaug collaborated, with Borlaug touring India and sending supplies for a range of Mexican dwarf varieties of wheat, which were to be bred with Japanese varieties. Initial testing in an experimental plot showed good results. The crop was high-yield, good quality, and disease free. There was hesitation by farmers to adopt the new variety whose high-yields were unnerving. In 1964, following repeated requests by Swaminathan to demonstrate the new variety, he was given funding to plant small demonstrations plots. A total of 150 demonstration plots on 1 hectare were planted. The results were promising and the anxieties of the farmers reduced. More modifications were made to the grain in the laboratory to better suit Indian conditions. The new wheat varieties were sown and in 1968 production went to 17 million tonnes, 5 million tonnes more than the last harvest.

Just before receiving his Nobel Prize in 1970, Norman Borlaug wrote to Swaminathan:

Notable contributions were made by Indian agronomists and geneticists such as Gurdev Khush and Dilbagh Singh Athwal. The Government of India declared India self-sufficient in food production in 1971. India and Swaminathan could now deal with other serious issues of access to food, hunger and nutrition. He was with IARI between 1954 and 1972.

Administrator and educator 
In 1972, Swaminathan was appointed as the Director-General of the Indian Council of Agricultural Research (ICAR) and a Secretary to the Government of India. In 1979, in a rare move for a scientist, he was made a Principal Secretary, a senior position in the Government of India. The next year he was shifted to the Planning Commission. As Director-General ICAR, he pushed for technical literacy, setting up centres all over India for this. Droughts during this period led him to form groups to watch weather and crop patterns, ultimately with the aim of protecting the poor from malnutrition. His shift to the Planning Commission for two years resulted in the introduction of women and environment with respect to development in India's five year plans for the first time.

In 1982, he was made the first Asian Director General of the International Rice Research Institute (IRRI) in the Philippines. He was there until 1988. One of the contributions he made during his tenure here was conducting an international conference "Women in Rice Farming Systems". America based Association for Women in Development gave Swaminathan their first award for "outstanding contributions to the integration of women in development" based on this. As Director General, he spread awareness among rice growing families of making value of each part of the rice crop. His leadership at IRRI was instrumental in the first World Food Prize being awarded to him. In 1984 he became the President and Vice-President of the International Union for Conservation of Nature (ICUN) and World Wildlife Fund respectively.

In 1987 he was awarded the first World Food Prize. The prize money was used to set up the M.S. Swaminathan Research Foundation. Accepting the award, Swaminathan spoke of the growing hunger despite the increase in food production. He spoke of the fear of sharing "power and resources", and that the goal of a world without hunger remains unfinished. In their commendation letters Javier Pérez de Cuéllar, Frank Press and President Ronald Reagan, and others recognized his efforts.

Swaminathan would go on to chair the World Food Prize Selection Committee following Borlaug. In ICAR, from the late 1950s onwards, he taught cytogenetics, radiation genetics, and mutation breeding. Swaminathan has mentored numerous Borlaug‐Ruan interns, part of the Borlaug‐Ruan International Internship.

Institution builder 
Swaminathan established the Nuclear Research Laboratory (NRL) at the Indian Agricultural Research Institute (IARI). He played a role in and promoting the setting up of the International Crop Research Institute for the Semi-Arid Tropics (ICRISAT) in India; the International Board for Plant Genetic Resources (IBPGR) (now known as Bioversity International) in Italy and the International Council for Research in Agro-Forestry (ICRAF) in Kenya. He helped to build and develop a number of institutions, and provide research support, in China, Vietnam, Myanmar, Thailand, Sri Lanka, Pakistan, Iran and Cambodia.

Later years
He co-chaired the United Nations Millennium Project on hunger from 2002 to 2005 and was head of the Pugwash Conferences on Science and World Affairs between 2002 and 2007. In 2005 Bruce Alberts, President of the U.S. National Academy of Sciences said of Dr. Swaminathan: "At 80, M.S. retains all the energy and idealism of his youth, and he continues to inspire good behaviour and more idealism from millions of his fellow human beings on this Earth. For that, we can all be thankful". Swaminathan had the aim of a hunger-free India by 2007.

He was the chair of the National Commission on Farmers constituted in 2004. In 2007, President A.P.J. Abdul Kalam nominated Swaminathan to the Rajya Sabha. Swaminathan introduced one bill during his tenure, The Women Farmers' Entitlements Bill 2011, however it lapsed. One of the aims it proposed was recognising women farmers.

A term coined by Swaminathan, Evergreen Revolution, based on enduring influence of the green revolution, aims to address the continuous increase in sustainable productivity that mankind requires. He has described it as "productivity with perpetuity".

In his later years, he has also been part of initiatives related to bridging the digital divide, and bringing research to decision makers in the field of hunger and nutrition.

Personal life 
M.S. Swaminathan is married to Mina Swaminathan whom he met in 1951 while they were both studying at Cambridge. They live in Chennai, Tamil Nadu. Their three daughters are Soumya Swaminathan (a paediatrician), Madhura Swaminathan (an economist), and Nitya Swaminathan (gender and rural development).

Gandhi and Ramana Maharshi were influences in his life. Of the 2000 acres their family owned, they donated one-third to Vinoba Bhave's cause. In an interview in 2011, he said that when he was young, he followed Swami Vivekananda.

Scientific career

Potato 
In the 1950s, Swaminathan's explanation and analysis of the origin and evolutionary processes of potato was a major contribution. He elucidated its origin as an autotetraploid and its cell division behaviour. His findings related to polyploids were also significant. Swaminathan's thesis in 1952 was based on his basic research related to "species differentiation and the nature of polyploidy in certain species of the genus Solanum, section Tuberarium". The impact was the greater ability to transfer genes from a wild species to the cultivated potato.

What made his research on potato valuable was its real world application in the development of new potato varieties. During his post-doctoral at Wisconsin University he helped develop a frost-resistant potato. His genetic analysis of potato, including the genetic traits that govern yield and growth, important factors in increasing productivity, was pivotal. His multi-disciplinary systems approach perspective brought together many different genetic facets.

Wheat 
In the 1950s and 60s Swaminathan did basic research into the cytogenetics of hexaploid wheat. The varieties of wheat and rice developed by Swaminathan and Borlaug were foundational to the green revolution.

Rice 
Efforts towards growing rice with C4 carbon fixation capabilities, which would allow a better photosynthesis and water usage, were started at International Rice Research Institute (IRRI) under Swaminathan. Swaminathan also played a role in the development of the world's first high-yielding basmati.

Radiation botany 
The Genetics Division of Indian Agricultural Research Institute (IARI) under Swaminathan was globally renowned for its research on mutagens. He set up a 'Cobalt-60 Gamma Garden' to study radiation mutation. Swaminathan's association with Homi J. Bhabha, Vikram Sarabhai, Raja Ramana, M. R. Srinivasan and other Indian nuclear scientists allowed agricultural scientists to access facilities at the Atomic Energy Establishment, Trombay (which would later become the Bhabha Atomic Research Centre). Swaminathan's first PhD student A. T. Natarajan would go on to write his thesis in this direction. One of the aims of such research was to increase plant responsiveness to fertilisers and demonstrate real world application of crop mutations. Swaminathan's early basic research on the effects of radiation on cells and organisms partly formed the base of future redox biology.

 calls Swaminathan's paper on neutron radiation in agriculture in 1966 presented at an International Atomic Energy Agency (IAEA) conference in USA as "epoch-making". The work of Swaminathan and his colleagues was relevant to food irradiation.

Public recognition

Awards and honours 
Swaminathan received the Mendel Memorial Medal from the Czechoslovak Academy of Sciences in 1965. Following this he received numerous international awards and honours, including the Ramon Magsaysay Award (1971), the Albert Einstein World Science Award (1986), the first World Food Prize (1987), the Tyler Prize for Environmental Achievement (1991), the Four Freedoms Award (2000), and the Planet and Humanity Medal of the International Geographical Union (2000). When accepting the Ramon Magsaysay Award, Swaminathan quoted Seneca "A hungry person listens neither to reason, nor to religion, nor is bent by any prayer."

He has been conferred with the Order of the Golden Heart of the Philippines, the Order of Agricultural Merit of France, the Order of the Golden Ark of Netherlands, and the Royal Order of Sahametrei of Cambodia. China awarded him with the "Award for International Co-operation on Environment and Development". In the 'Dr Norman E. Borlaug Hall of Laureates' at Des Moines, Iowa, United States, there is an artwork of Swaminathan made up of 250,000 pieces of glass. International Rice Research Institute (IRRI) has named a building and a scholarship fund after him.

One of the first national awards he received was the Shanti Swarup Bhatnagar Award in 1961. Following this he has been conferred with the Padma Shri, Padma Bhushan, Padma Vibhushan, India's fourth, third, and second-highest civilian awards, as well as the H K Firodia award, the Lal Bahadur Shastri National Award and the Indira Gandhi Prize. As of 2002, he had 28 national and 24 international awards. In 2016 Biotech Express magazine listed 33 national and 32 international awards. In 2004, an agricultural think-tank in India named an annual award after Swaminathan, the eponymously named 'Award for Leadership in Agriculture'.

Honorary doctorates and fellowships 
He is the recipient of 84 honorary doctorates and has been a guide for numerous Ph.D. scholars. Sardar Patel University conferred him with an honorary degree in 1970, Delhi University, Banaras Hindu University and others would follow. Internationally, Technical University of Berlin (1981) and Asian Institute of Technology (1985) has honoured him. University of Wisconsin honoured Swaminathan with an honorary doctorate in 1983. When University of Massachusetts, Boston honoured him was a science doctorate they commented on the "magnificent inclusiveness of (Swaminathan's) concerns, by nation, socioeconomic group, gender, inter-generational, and including both human and natural environments." Fitzwilliam College, Cambridge, from where he got his PhD in botany, made him an honorary fellow in 2014.

Swaminathan has been elected a fellow of a number of science academies in India. Internationally he has been recognised as a fellow by 30 academies of science and societies across the world including USA, United Kingdom, Russia, Sweden, Italy, China, Bangladesh, as well as the European Academy of Arts, Science and Humanities. He was a founder fellow of The World Academy of Sciences. National Agrarian University in Peru conferred him with an honorary professorship.

Publications

Swaminathan published 46 single-author papers between 1950 and 1980. In total he had 254 papers to his credit, 155 of which he was the single or first author. His scientific papers are in the fields of crop improvement (95), cytogenetics and genetics (87) and phylogenetics (72). His most frequent publishers were Indian Journal of Genetics (46), Current Science (36), Nature (12) and Radiation Botany (12). Selected publications include,
 
 
 
 
 
 
 

In addition he has written a few books on the general theme of his life's work, biodiversity and sustainable agriculture for alleviation of hunger. Swaminathan's books, papers, dialogues and speeches include:

Controversies
In the 1970s, a scientific paper in which Swaminathan and his team claimed to have produced a mutant breed of wheat by gamma irradiation of a Mexican variety (Sonora 64) resulting in Sharbati Sonora, claimed to have a very high lysine content, led to a major controversy. The case was claimed to be an error made by the laboratory assistant. The episode was also compounded by the suicide of an agricultural scientist. It has been studied as part of a systemic problem in Indian agriculture research.

A paper published on 25 November 2018 edition of Current Science journal titled 'Modern Technologies for Sustainable Food and Nutrition Security' listed Swaminathan as a co-author. The article was criticised by a number of scientific experts, including by K. VijayRaghavan, the Principal Scientific Adviser to the Government of India, who commented that it was "deeply flawed and full of errors". Swaminathan cleared things out by saying that his role in the paper was "extremely limited" and that he shouldn't have been named as the co-author.

Further reading

Biographies 
Books
 
 
 — 
 
 
 
 
 

Short Biographies

Footnotes

Citations

External links

 
 
 Search Results for author Swaminathan, M. S. on AGRICOLA, US National Agricultural Library
 
 
 
 Official Rajya Sabha, Parliament of India, profile, pg 515
Prof.M.S.Swaminathan is a part of the selection jury in Mahaveer Awards in Bhagwan Mahaveer Awards

1925 births
Living people
Malayali people
People from Thanjavur district
Indian agronomists
Indian geneticists
Scientists from Chennai
Alumni of Fitzwilliam College, Cambridge
Alumni of the University of Cambridge
University of Wisconsin–Madison alumni
Tamil Nadu Agricultural University alumni
University College Thiruvananthapuram alumni
University of Madras alumni
Nominated members of the Rajya Sabha
Indian development specialists
Fellows of Bangladesh Academy of Sciences
Ramon Magsaysay Award winners
Fellows of the Royal Society
Foreign associates of the National Academy of Sciences
Fellows of the Indian National Science Academy
Fellows of The National Academy of Sciences, India
Foreign Members of the Russian Academy of Sciences
Members of National Advisory Council, India
Fellows of the Indian Academy of Sciences
Fellows of the National Academy of Agricultural Sciences
20th-century Indian biologists
Recipients of the Four Freedoms Award
Recipients of the Shanti Swarup Bhatnagar Award in Biological Science
Indian expatriates in the Netherlands
Indian expatriates in the United Kingdom
Indian expatriates in the United States
Agriculture and food award winners
Fellows of Fitzwilliam College, Cambridge
Indian agriculturalists